Minuscule 243 (in the Gregory-Aland numbering), Θε304 (Soden), is a Greek minuscule manuscript of the New Testament, on paper. Palaeographically it has been assigned to the 14th century.

Description 

The codex contains the text of the Gospel of Matthew and Gospel of Luke on 224 paper leaves (size ). The text is written in one column per page, 31 lines per page. The evangelical text is surrounded by a commentary of Theophylact.

At the end of the manuscript it has extracts from Gregory of Nyssa.

Text 

The Greek text of the codex is a representative of the Byzantine text-type. Aland placed it in Category V.
It was not examined by the Claremont Profile Method.

History 

Formerly the manuscript was held in the Iberian monastery at Athos peninsula. It was brought to Moscow, by the monk Arsenius, on the suggestion of the Patriarch Nikon, in the reign of Alexei Mikhailovich Romanov (1645-1676). The manuscript was collated by C. F. Matthaei.

The manuscript is currently housed at the State Historical Museum (V. 92, S. 388) at Moscow.

See also 

 List of New Testament minuscules
 Biblical manuscript
 Textual criticism

References

Further reading 

 C. F. Matthaei, Lectiones Mosquenses (Leipzig 1779).
 C. F. Matthei, Novum Testamentum Graece et Latine, (Riga, 1782-1788). (as m)
 Kurt Treu, Die Griechischen Handschriften des Neuen Testaments in der UdSSR; eine systematische Auswertung des Texthandschriften in Leningrad, Moskau, Kiev, Odessa, Tbilisi und Erevan, T & U 90 (Berlin, 1966), pp. 278–280.

Greek New Testament minuscules
14th-century biblical manuscripts